Amboli is a village in Dharwad district of Karnataka, India.

Demographics
As of the 2011 Census of India there were 190 households in Amboli and a total population of 956 consisting of 493 males and 463 females. There were 116 children ages 0-6.

References

Villages in Dharwad district